Chance Meeting may refer to:

 Chance Meeting (writer)
Chance Meeting (1954 film), British Cold War drama
Chance Meeting (1959 film), British murder mystery film
Chance Meeting (album), 1997 release of concert by Tal Farlow and Lenny Breau
 "Chance Meeting", a song by Roxy Music on the 1972 album Roxy Music (album)

See also
Chance Meeting on a Dissecting Table of a Sewing Machine and an Umbrella, debut album (in 1979) by Nurse With Wound